The Biggest Show on Earth is a surviving 1918 American silent drama film directed by Jerome Storm and written by Julien Josephson and Florence Vincent. The film stars Enid Bennett, Bliss Chevalier, Ethel Lynne, Melbourne MacDowell, Jack Nelson, and Earle Rodney. The film was released on April 28, 1918, by Paramount Pictures.

Plot
As described in a film magazine, Roxie Kemp (Bennett), a lion tamer in her father's circus, is sent to boarding school. The girls there have nothing to do with Roxie until she rescues them from a mad dog. Marjorie Trent (Lynne), with a long line of ancestors, invites her to her home for the holiday season. As soon as Owen Trent (Rodney) sees Roxie, he thinks she is the only girl for him. His dream is shattered after Mrs. Trent (Chevalier) learns Roxie is the daughter of a circus owner. However, Col. Jeffrey Trent (Stockdale) tells her that their income comes from the circus, so the young couple are allowed to continue their courtship.

Cast 
Enid Bennett as Roxie Kemp
Bliss Chevalier as Mrs. Trent
Ethel Lynne as Marjorie Trent 
Melbourne MacDowell as Nat Kemp
Jack Nelson as Ross
Earle Rodney as Owen Trent
Carl Stockdale as Col. Jeffrey Trent

Preservation
Previously lost, a print was found in the Gosfilmofond Archive, Moscow.

References

External links

1918 films
1910s English-language films
Silent American drama films
1918 drama films
Paramount Pictures films
Films directed by Jerome Storm
American black-and-white films
American silent feature films
1910s rediscovered films
Rediscovered American films
1910s American films